Española Island (Spanish: Isla Española) is part of the Galápagos Islands. The English named it Hood Island after Viscount Samuel Hood. It is located in the extreme southeast of the archipelago and is considered, along with Santa Fe, one of the oldest, at approximately four million years. A popular tourist stop, Isla Española is the most southerly island in the Galápagos Archipelago. The climate is very dry, like most of the Archipelago. But due to the flatness of the island, it is the driest of these islands, with only a few inches of rain per year. It is about a 10- to 12-hour trip by boat from Isla Santa Cruz.

Wildlife
Tourists come to see the waved albatrosses (from March to January, almost the entire world population breeds on the island) and the mating dances of blue-footed boobies. Two spots are especially popular with visitors: Bahía Gardner, which has a lovely beach; and Punta Suárez, of interest because of its varied bird-life. This island has its own species of animals, such as the Hood mockingbird, which has a longer and more curved beak than the one on the central islands; the Española lava lizard; and the marine iguana of the subspecies venustissimus, which has red markings on its back. There are also swallow-tailed gulls, Galapagos hawks and other birds. The island has been recognised as an Important Bird Area (IBA) by BirdLife International.

While Española Island is one of the oldest of the Galápagos Islands, this island is dying, slowly becoming a rocky, barren land with little or no vegetation. But this does give large bays, with sand and soft shingle which attracts a healthy number of Galápagos sea lions. In January 2020, it was widely reported that a male Galápagos tortoise named Diego fathered and resurrected the island tortoise population, saving the diminishing species from near extinction.

In popular culture
American author Herman Melville mentions the island in his novella The Encantadas, or Enchanted Isles (1854).
The novel La iguana (1982) by Spanish writer Alberto Vázquez-Figueroa takes place in the island. The novel was later cinematized as Iguana by American film director Monte Hellman (1988).

References

External links

Espanola Island
Espanola wildlife and visitor sites Galapagosonline.com*
Fauna at Gardner Bay

Islands of the Galápagos Islands
Seabird colonies
Important Bird Areas of the Galápagos Islands